McMurry is a surname. Notable people with the surname include:

Frank Morton McMurry (1862–1936), American educator
John E. McMurry, whose name is given to the McMurry reaction
Lillian McMurry (1921–1999), American record producer

See also
McMurray (disambiguation)
McMurry University in Abilene, Texas
The McMurry reaction, in which two carbonyls are coupled to give a single alkene